Bulguksa is located on the slopes of Mount Toham (Jinheon-dong, Gyeongju city, North Gyeongsang province, South Korea). It is a head temple of the Jogye Order of Korean Buddhism and encompasses six National treasures of South Korea, including the Dabotap and Seokgatap stone pagodas, Cheongun-gyo (Blue Cloud Bridge), and two gilt-bronze statues of Buddha. The temple is classified as Historic and Scenic Site No. 1 by the South Korean government. In 1995, Bulguksa was added to the UNESCO World Heritage List together with the Seokguram Grotto, which lies four kilometers to the east.

The temple is considered as a masterpiece of the golden age of Buddhist art in the Silla kingdom. It is currently the head temple of the 11th district of the Jogye Order of Korean Buddhism.

Among the earliest woodblock prints in the world, a version of the Dharani sutra dated between 704 and 751 was found there in 1966. Its Buddhist text was printed on a  mulberry paper scroll.

History

The temple's records state that a small temple was built on this site under King Beopheung in 528. The Samguk Yusa records that the current temple was constructed under King Gyeongdeok in 751, begun by chief minister Kim Daeseong to pacify the spirits of his parents. The building was completed in 774 by the Silla royal court, after Kim's death, and given its current name Bulguksa (Temple of the Buddha Land).

The temple was renovated during the Goryeo Dynasty and the early Joseon Dynasty. During the Imjin wars, the wooden buildings were burned to the ground. After 1604, reconstruction and expansion of Bulguksa started, followed by about 40 renovations until 1805.

After World War II and the Korean War, a partial restoration was conducted in 1966. Upon an extensive archeological investigation, major restoration was conducted between 1969 and 1973 by the order of President Park Chung Hee, bringing Bulguksa to its current form.  The famous stone structures are preserved from the original Silla construction.

Structure

The temple is located on the slopes of Tohamsan, in Jinheon-dong, Gyeongju.

The entrance to the temple, Sokgyemun, has a double-sectioned staircase and bridge (National Treasure No. 23) that leads to the inside of the temple compound. The stairway is 33 steps high, corresponding to the 33 steps to enlightenment. The lower portion, Cheongungyo (Blue Cloud Bridge) is 6.3 meters long and has 17 steps. The upper portion, Baegungyo (White Cloud Bridge) is 5.4 meters and has 16 steps.  The stairway leads to Jahamun (Mauve Mist Gate).

There are two pagodas on the temple site, which is unusual.  The three-story Seokgatap (Sakyamuni Pagoda) which stands at 8.2 meters is a traditional Korean-style stone pagoda with simple lines and minimal detailing. Seokgatap is over 13 centuries old. Dabotap (Many Treasure Pagoda) is 10.4 meters tall and dedicated to the Many Treasures Buddha mentioned in the Lotus Sutra. In contrast to Seokgatap, Dabotap is known for its highly ornate structure. Its image is reproduced on the South Korean 10 won coin. Dabotap and Seokgatap are Korean National Treasures nos. 20 and 21, respectively.

The terrestrial and the two celestial abodes are manifested in Bulguksa: the terrestrial with a Shakyamuni Buddha Lotus Sutra, the celestial with Amitabha Buddha Avatamska Sutra. The large temple site is centred on two courts. One of the courts is centred on Daeungjeon, the hall which houses the Shakyamuni Buddha. The other is centred on Geungnakjeon, the hall of paradise where the Seven Treasure Bridge Chilbogyo is housed.

Daeungjeon (대웅전,大雄殿), the Hall of Great Enlightenment, is the main hall. Dabotap and Seokgatap stand before this hall.  The hall enshrines the Sakyamuni Buddha and was first built in 681. Behind the main hall stands Museoljeon (무설전,無說殿), the Hall of No Words. This hall gets its name from the belief that Buddha's teachings could not be taught by mere words alone. It is one of the oldest buildings in the complex and was probably first built in 670. The Gwaneumjeon (Avalokitesvara's Shrine, 관음전,觀音殿) houses an image of the Avalokitesvara, the Bodhisattva of Perfect Compassion, and stands at the highest point of the complex. The Birojeon (Vairocana Buddha Hall, 비로전,毘盧殿), which sits below the Gwaneumjeon, houses national treasure No.26 while the Geuknakjeon (Hall of Supreme Bliss, 극락전), standing near the main compound, houses the gilt-bronze buddha that is the national treasure No.27.

Official treasures at Bulguksa

National Treasures No.20 and 21

The two famous stone pagodas, Dabotap and Seokgatap reside in the main courtyard of the Bulguksa Temple complex.  They are, respectively, the twentieth and twenty-first national treasures of Korea and were designated on December 20, 1962.

National Treasure No.22

The Yeonhwagyo (Lotus Flower Bridge, 연화교,蓮華橋) and Chilbogyo (Seven Treasures Bridge, 칠보교,七寶橋) are a pair of bridges at Bulguksa. This bridge was designated as the 22nd national treasure on December 20, 1962. The bridge lead to Anyangmun (Peace Enhancing Gate, 안양문,安養門) leading to Geuknakjeon (the Hall of the Pure Land). This pair were built at the same time as their brother bridges, National Treasure No.23.

These pair of bridges share the 45 degree incline, arch underneath, and the combination bridge/staircase design of their brother bridges. However, one noticeable difference is that this bridge is smaller.  The lower Lotus Flower Bridge has 10 steps while the upper Seven Treasures Bridge contains 8 steps. This bridge is on the west in relation to the Blue Cloud and White Cloud Bridges. The Lotus Flower Bridge is known for its delicate carvings of Lotus Flowers on each step but these have faded with the weight of many pilgrims. Today, visitors are restricted from walking on the bridge.

National Treasure No.23

The Cheongungyo (Blue Cloud Bridge, 청운교,靑雲橋) and Baegungyo (White Cloud Bridge, 백운교,白雲橋) Bridges of Bulguksa Temple are two bridges that are a part of a stairway that leads to the temple. The bridges were probably built in 750 during the reign of King Gyeongdeok. Although built separately, they are designated together as one single national treasure. They were designated as the 23rd national treasure on December 20, 1962.

The Blue Cloud Bridge makes up the upper span of the stair while the White Cloud Bridge is the lower part. The bridges lead to the Jahamun (Golden Purple Gate, 자하문,紫霞門) which leads to Sakyamuni Hall. There are 34 steps on the stairway, which slopes at a 30 degree angle. The upper Blue Cloud Bridge has sixteen steps while the lower White Cloud Bridge has eighteen. The large arch underneath the stairwell testifies to the use of arches in Silla-style bridges.

National Treasure No.26

National Treasure No.26 (경주 불국사 금동비로자나불좌상, 慶州 佛國寺 金銅毘盧遮那佛坐像, Gyeongju Bulguksa geumdong birojana buljwasang), designated on December 20, 1962, is a seated gilt-bronze Vairocana Buddha statue at Bulguksa Temple.

The Buddha of Enlightenment is enshrined in the Birojeon. It is 1.77 meters in height and made from gilt-bronze. The head of the Buddha has an usnisa, a symbol of supreme wisdom. The head of the Buddha was made by fusing two shells to each other and the face is elongated and soft. The robes of the Buddha are highly detailed and the simulation of folded cloth rippling down from the shoulder to the lap is done with high skill. The hands of the Buddha are in a position, the right index finger covered by the left hand, which often is used to symbolize the Buddha of Enlightenment. The figure is estimated to be from the 9th century due to stylistic evidence, including the overly wide lap and the lack of tension in the depiction of the robes and face of the Buddha.

National Treasure No.27

The seated gilt-bronze Amitabha Buddha statue of Bulguksa Temple is National Treasure No.27. (경주 불국사 금동아미타여래좌상, 慶州 佛國寺 金銅阿彌陀如來坐像, Gyeongju Bulguksa geumdong amita yeoraejwasang) and was designated on December 20, 1962.

The Amitabha Buddha statue is 1.66 meters in height and enshrined in Geuknakjeon. This gilt-bronze statue was probably cast in the late 8th or early part of the 9th century and it shares the style of National Treasure No.26. The head of the statue is made by fixing two shell-like pieces together.  The face has a distinctively aquiline nose. The Buddha has broad shoulders and strong chest while the large lap gives the figure a sense of proportional harmony and stability. The style of the robe seems to be more stylized and haphazard. The position of the left hand raised at shoulder-level palm forward and the right hand is placed at the lap. The style of the Buddha seems to follow an abstract and stylized tradition rather than a representation of realism.

Treasure No.61 
According to the page referencing all National Treasure from South Korea, this is not the correct number nor there is any other national treasure in Bulguksa temple (the only other one being treasure number 126, which is an artefact found in one of the pagoda).

This sarira pagoda (사리탑), or stupa, looks like a stone lantern. It stands 2.1 meters tall and is located at the left side of the front garden of Birojeon. The artifact was at one point taken to Japan in 1906 but was returned in 1933. It is from the Goryeo Dynasty, but shows the influence of Silla Dynasty art.

A sarira is a container for the relics or remains of famous priests or royalty. It is said that this sarira contained the remains of eight priests or a queen. The three main features of the piece are the foundation stone, the main body, and the ornamental top. The foundation is an octagonal stone decorated with carvings. Atop this foundation is a circular stone incised with lotus motifs. The pillar supports of the main body are carved with a cloud motif while the main body is cylindrical and has four bas-reliefs of Buddha and bodhisattvas and are accompanied by flower motifs. The top of the pagoda has twelve sides which meet into a hexagonal shape.

See also
 Korean Buddhist temples
 List of South Korean tourist attractions
 List of Buddhist topics
 Tourism in Gyeongju

References

 Life in Korea: Bulguksa.
 National Treasure No.22
 National Treasure No.23
 National Treasure No.26
 National Treasure No.27
 Treasure No.61

External links

 Bulguksa Official site
 Korean National Heritage Online: Bulguksa
 Oriental Architecture profile

528 establishments
Religious organizations established in the 6th century
Tourist attractions in Gyeongju
Buddhist temples of the Jogye Order
Buddhist temples in Gyeongju
World Heritage Sites in South Korea
National Treasures of South Korea
6th-century establishments in Korea
6th-century Buddhist temples
Buddhist relics
Silla